Pirata may refer to:
 Pirata (album), a 1989 album by Litfiba
 Pirata (footballer) (born 1987), a Portuguese footballer
 Pirata (graphic novel), a graphic novel by Pol Medina, Jr
 Pirata (spider), a genus of wolf spiders
 Il pirata, an 1827 opera by Vincenzo Bellini
 Marco Pantani (1970–2004), Italian cyclist, nicknamed Il Pirata
 Il Pirata: Marco Pantani, a 2007 television film about the cyclist 
 Pirate Party (Spain) (PIRATA), a political party in Spain
 the Prediction and Research Moored Array in the Atlantic network of buoys, known as PIRATA

See also
 Pirate (disambiguation)